Khiḍr Khān Surak was the governor of Bengal from 1539 to 1541 CE.

History
When Sher Shah Suri ascended to the throne of Delhi in 1539, he appointed Khan to govern the province of Bengal.

In 1541, Sher Shah Suri, who recognised the importance of the Bengal province for the development of the Sur Empire, was informed of a number of Khan's treacherous acts. He was informed of Khan's marriage to a daughter of Ghiyasuddin Mahmud Shah, who was the late Sultan of the Bengal Sultanate's former Hussain Shahi dynasty that Suri defeated in 1538. It is thought that Khan married the late Sultan's daughter as a method to claim independence and be known as the rightful sovereign heir of the Hussain Shahi dynasty. Suri set off for Bengal to deal with Khan. Upon reaching him, Suri questioned Khan on why he married the princess without his consent and why he was sat on the Tawqi (raised platform) as the independent Sultans of Bengal used to do. As a result of Khan's treachery, Suri swiftly dismissed him as governor and imprisoned him. Suri then divided Bengal into numerous administrative units each governed by a Muqta and then appointed Qazi Fazilat of Agra as the Chief of all of the Muqtas of Bengal.

See also
List of rulers of Bengal
History of Bengal
History of Bangladesh
History of India

References

Governors of Bengal
16th-century Indian Muslims